Baldur Bragason (born 29 May 1968) is an Icelandic former footballer who played as a midfielder. He won five caps for the Iceland national football team between 1992 and 1993, and had spells in Iceland, Germany, Greece and Denmark during his playing career.

Shortly after he had won a place in the national team Baldur was in a motorcycle accident that left doctors doubting whether he could play again, but Baldur overcame that. During his injury, in 1994, he switched to Leiftur from Valur.

References

1968 births
Living people
Baldur Bragason
Association football midfielders
Baldur Bragason
Lyngby Boldklub players
Panachaiki F.C. players
Baldur Bragason